The South Carolina Department of Transportation (SCDOT) is a government agency in the US state of South Carolina. Its mission is to build and maintain roads and bridges and administer mass transit services.

By state law, the SCDOT's function and purpose is the systematic planning, construction, maintenance, and operation of the state highway system and the development of a statewide mass transit system that is consistent with the needs and desires of the public. The SCDOT also coordinates all state and federal programs relating to highways. The goal of the SCDOT is to provide adequate, safe, and efficient transportation services for the movement of people and goods.

History
The South Carolina Department of Transportation is still familiarly known as the Highway Department, which is what the agency was called until May 13, 1977 when an act of the South Carolina General Assembly reformed the agency as the Department of Highways and Public Transportation (SCDHPT).

The current name, the Department of Transportation, was established in the State Government Restructuring Act of 1993. This act split functions of the SCDHPT to establish the SCDOT and the Department of Public Safety.

The roots of the state agency trace back to the establishment of a five-member highway commission in 1917. Prior to 1917, county governments were entirely responsible for building and maintaining roads. The Federal Aid Road Act of 1916 and the promise of federal money to build highways served as the impetus for the creation of the commission. However, the commission lacked "the authority to designate roads to be improved with federal funds and the power to supervise directly the work being done".

Organization

Commission and Secretary
The SCDOT is a department of the state government in the executive branch that reports to a cabinet secretary and a seven-member commission. The Governor appoints one member of the commission and the Secretary of Transportation, who is a member of the Governor's cabinet. The current secretary is Christy A. Hall.
The other six commissioners each represent a district. The commission districts coincide with the congressional districts of South Carolina. The commissioner is appointed for a term of four years by legislative delegation for that district, that is, the members of the General Assembly that represent voters in that district. The chairman is selected from among all seven members by a vote of the commission.

The secretary hires the division heads, who are known as Deputy Secretaries.

Divisions of the SCDOT
The SCDOT has at least three divisions: Engineering, Intermodal Planning, and Finance and Procurement.

The SCDOT is a centralized government agency. Planning, design, procurement, finance, and human resource functions all operate from the central office, or headquarters, in the state capitol of Columbia. The headquarters building is named for Silas N. Pearman, a former state highway engineer and chief commissioner of the agency.

Intermodal Planning Division
The Intermodal Planning Division comprises the Department of Planning and the Office of Public Transit.  The latter oversees and supports the development of a mass transit system and administers the state and federal aid mass transit program.

Engineering Division
The Engineering division is the largest part of the agency. The Deputy Secretary for this division is traditionally known as the State Highway Engineer. The current Deputy Secretary is Leland Colvin.  This position is generally recognized as the second-ranking person in the agency.

Finance and Procurement Division
The Division of Finance and Procurement is responsible for the federal aid reimbursements and other financial matters of the agency.

Engineering Districts
The SCDOT field offices are divided into seven districts headed by a District Engineering Administrator. The engineering district lines do not follow the same lines as the commission districts. Each District has responsibility for the maintenance, construction, traffic, and equipment (mechanical) operations within its boundaries. A district will oversee six to eight counties.

District offices are located in Columbia (District #1), Greenwood (#2), Greenville (#3), Chester, (#4), Florence (#5), Charleston (#6), Orangeburg (#7).

References

External links
 SCDOT Official Site
 South Carolina State Government Site

Transportation in South Carolina
State departments of transportation of the United States
Government agencies established in 1977
1977 establishments in South Carolina
Transportation